Lakewood Park may refer to: 

 Lakewood Park (North Little Rock, Arkansas), listed on the National Register of Historic Places in Arkansas
 Lakewood Park, California, a place in Los Angeles County
 Lakewood Park, Florida, census-designated place in St. Lucie County
 Lakewood Park, Tennessee, census-designated place in Coffee County